Senator Warner may refer to:

Members of the United States Senate
John Warner (1927–2021), U.S. Senator from Virginia from 1979 to 2009
Mark Warner (born 1954), U.S. Senator from Virginia since 2009
Willard Warner (1826–1906), U.S. Senator from Alabama from 1868 to 1871
William Warner (Missouri politician) (1840–1916), U.S. Senator from Missouri from 1905 to 1911

United States state senate members
Andrew S. Warner (1819–1887), New York State Senate
Charles J. Warner (1875–1955), Nebraska State Senate
Clement Warner (1836–1916), Wisconsin State Senate
Earle S. Warner (1880–1971), New York State Senate
Frank B. Warner (1863–?), Missouri State Senate
Fred M. Warner (1865–1923), Michigan State Senate
Hans Warner (1844–1896), Wisconsin State Senate
Ivan Warner (1919–1994), New York State Senate
Jerome Warner (1927–1997), Nebraska State Senate
John Warner (North Dakota politician) (born 1952), North Dakota State Senate
Oliver Warner (politician) (1841–1885), Massachusetts State Senate
P. Dean Warner (1822–1910), Michigan State Senate